Caloptilia cuculipennella (commonly known as the feathered slender) is a moth of the family Gracillariidae. It is found in Holarctic Region, including most of Europe.

The wingspan is .The posterior tibiae are smooth above. Forewings are whitish, with numerous ochreous or brown strigulae finely irrorated with black; an oblique
fascia near base hardly reaching costa, a second before middle hardly reaching dorsum, a third beyond middle interrupted in disc, and a costal spot at 3/4 ochreous or brownish, finely irrorated with black. Hindwings are dark grey. The larva is green -whitish; head and plate of 2 brown.
The moth flies from July to September.The larvae feed on Fraxinus excelsior, Ligustrum vulgare and Syringa vulgaris.

References

External links
UKmoths
Lepidoptera of Belgium
Swedish Moths

cuculipennella
Moths described in 1796
Moths of Europe
Moths of Japan